S.M. Muneer (1944/1945 – 28 November 2022) was a Pakistani businessman and industrialist who served as patron-in-chief of Korangi Association of Trade and Industry (KATI). Additionally, he was a board member for various banks and private businesses and had ties to the leather trade. He has also managed several hospitals, maternity homes, schools, and institutions in Karachi, Faisalabad, and Chiniot while serving as chairman of Chiniot Anjuman Islamia.

Muneer was a member of the Institute of Business Management and Greenwich University, Karachi, boards of governors and the Federation of Pakistan Chambers of Commerce & Industry. He was on the boards of The Kidney Centre Post Graduate Training Institute and Shaukat Khanum Cancer Hospital in Lahore.

Muneer died on 28 November 2022, at the age of 77.

Awards and honours
Muneer has received several awards.
 Best Export Performance trophy by FPCCI
 Gold Medallion Award by the International Export Association, UK
 Best Businessman of the Year Award by FPCCI.
 Sitara-i-Eisaar (2006)
 Sitara-i-Imtiaz (2007)
 Awarded an Honorary PhD degree by the Governor of Sindh (2009)
 Life Time Achievement Award by President of Pakistan (2012)
 Life Time Achievement Award by then-Mayor of Markham  Frank Scarpitti (2012)

References

1940s births
Year of birth missing
2022 deaths
Pakistani businesspeople
Pakistani industrialists
Recipients of Sitara-i-Imtiaz
Pakistani philanthropists